So Far So Close is the fourth studio album by Brazilian jazz artist Eliane Elias. It was released in 1989 via Blue Note label. She wrote eight compositions for this album. This is her first album recorded via Blue Note.

Reception
In his review Scott Yanow of Allmusic stated "Having established her credentials as a fine acoustic pianist, she switched back to her less personal synthesizer work and contributed some rather mundane wordless vocals. The music (which includes some solos from tenor saxophonist Michael Brecker and Randy Brecker on flugelhorn) is not terrible, but it lacks a sense of adventure and sounds as if potential radio airplay was its main goal."

Track listing

Select personnel
Don Alias – percussion, producer
Jim Beard – programming, synthesizer
Michael Brecker – tenor saxophone
Randy Brecker – flugelhorn 
Café – percussion
Deodato – associate producer, engineer, producer
Eliane Elias – arranger, piano, producer, synthesizer, vocals
Peter Erskine – drums
Will Lee – bass

References

External links

1989 albums
Eliane Elias albums
Blue Note Records albums